

Radio
The Buccaneers' current flagship radio station is WXTB, 97.9 FM Tampa. Prior to the 2017 season, 620 AM WDAE broadcast the games. A network of Florida radio stations simulcast the games. The play-by-play announcer since 1989 has been Gene Deckerhoff. Former Bucs tight end Dave Moore joined Deckerhoff as analyst for the 2007 season. T. J. Rives works as the sideline reporter.

The current line up of Tampa Bay Buccaneers radio affiliates is:

Tampa - 97.9 FM WXTB
Tampa - 96.1 FM WTMP-FM and 1470 AM WMGG (Spanish-language broadcasts)
Fort Myers - 770 AM and 104.3 FM WBCN
Hernando County - 1450 AM WWJB
Miami - 940 AM WINZ
Orlando - 740 AM and 96.9 FM WYGM
Space Coast/Treasure Coast - 95.9 FM WROK
West Palm Beach - 640 AM WMEN

Past
Broadcast legend and former Green Bay Packers announcer Ray Scott was the play-by-play man for the Bucs' 1976 and 1977 seasons. In 1978, Dick Crippen called the games for the first half of the season while Jim Gallogly did so for the second half. Mark Champion held the position from 1979 to 1988.

Former Buccaneer Hardy Nickerson served as color commentator for one season in 2006, until he signed with the Bears as a linebackers coach on February 23, 2007. Nickerson had replaced Scot Brantley, who was the commentator from 1999 through 2005. Jesse Ventura, the famous professional wrestler, actor, and former governor of Minnesota, was Deckerhoff's partner on the Bucs radio broadcasts for one year and was known for exclaiming "positively Gene", 1990, and former Buc David Logan held that position after Ventura until his death after the 1998 season. Dave Kocourek and Fran Curci were also color commentors for the Buccaneers during their earlier years.

Ronnie Lane previously worked as a sideline reporter.

The Bucs have broadcast on FM radio since signing with Top 40 station 104.7 WRBQ-FM in 1992. The team moved to 99.5 WQYK-FM, in 1994, then to WFUS in 2004.

Television
While regular season and post-season games in the NFL are all broadcast by national television contracts on CBS, FOX, NBC, ESPN and NFL Network, the television broadcasts are for the most part handled by the individual teams. Preseason games not picked up for national broadcast are broadcast, beginning in 2011 on WTSP Channel 10, the Tampa CBS affiliate, after having been on WFLA Channel 8, from 2003 through 2010. WFTV Channel 9 simulcasts the broadcast in the Orlando area. Chris Myers is the play-by-play announcer with Ronde Barber as color commentator. Both Myers and Barber work nationally with FOX Sports. 
CBS, FOX and NBC games are shown respectively in Tampa Bay on WTSP, WTVT and WFLA, while they are shown respectively in Orlando on WKMG, WOFL and WESH.  Monday Night Football games are simulcast locally on WFTS, and NFL Network games can be seen locally on WFLA-TV.

Past
WTOG Channel 44 was the previous home to Buccaneer preseason games for many years, ending in 2002. Former CBS play-by-play and ESPN golf broadcaster Jim Kelly was the play-by-play announcer for many of those games in the 1980s and early 1990s, and Hank Stram and Joe Namath were commentators. In the early years of the franchise, WTVT-13, then a CBS affiliate, broadcast some Buccaneer preseason games. Sports anchor Andy Hardy handled the play-by-play, and for one game in 1978, his broadcast partner was his friend, Florida State alumni and movie actor Burt Reynolds. Ron Jaworski previously served as color commentator, until he signed with MNF for 2007.

By year
data not complete

References

 
Tampa Bay Buccaneers
broadcasters